Most Known Hits is an album by hip-hop group Three 6 Mafia. It is a collection of some of their biggest mainstream songs and was released in 2005, following the similarly titled studio album Most Known Unknown.

Track listing

2005 greatest hits albums
Three 6 Mafia compilation albums
Gangsta rap compilation albums